Invitation to the Waltz is a novel by Rosamond Lehmann, first published in 1932 by Chatto & Windus Ltd. The prequel to Lehmann's The Weather in the Streets (1936), the novel follows the preparations of two sisters, Kate and Olivia Curtis, for Sir John and Lady Spencer's dance. BBC Radio recorded and broadcast in 2001 a dramatization by Tina Pepler as Olivia's stream of consciousness.

Plot summary

Characters 
Olivia Curtis

Kate Curtis

Mrs Curtis

Etty

Rollo Spencer

Marigold Spencer

Nicola Maude

Lady Spencer

Sir John

References

1932 British novels